The 1611 Aizu earthquake occurred on September 27, 1611, in the Aizu Basin in present day Fukushima Prefecture, Japan. According to the official report, it was estimated that there were more than 3,700 fatalities. Aizuwakamatsu Castle, many temples, and about 20,000 houses collapsed in the stricken areas.

Overview 

 Date: September 27, 1611
 Magnitude: 6.9 MK
 Epicenter: Aizu Basin (present day Fukushima Prefecture)　
 Death toll: 3,700+ (official estimate)

References 

1611 in Japan
1611 earthquakes
Earthquakes of the Edo period